Dog's Breakfast or A Dog's Breakfast may refer to:

Film and television
 A Dog's Breakfast, a 2006 Canadian film 
 "A Dog's Breakfast", a 2016 episode of TV series Limitless
 "Dog's Breakfast", a 1997 episode of TV series Duggan

Music
 Dog's Breakfast, a 1999 EP by the Sick Puppies
 "A Dog's Breakfast", a song by Tourniquet from the 1991 album Psycho Surgery
 "New Breed"/"Dog's Breakfast", a 1986 single by The Mackenzies

Other uses
 Dog's Breakfast, a former furniture company of Jan Cameron